Virgil Lamar Ware (December 6, 1949 – September 15, 1963) was an African American eighth-grader shot to death after the Birmingham church bombing.

Personal life 
Growing up in Pratt City, Alabama, Ware was the third of six brothers. He was an eighth-grade A student, on the football team, and had aspirations to become a lawyer. He had a job as a paper boy with his brother James when the shooting occurred.

Death and afterward 
On Sept. 15, 1963, Larry Joe Sims and Michael Lee Farley, age 16, had planned to attend a white supremacist rally and motorcade from the suburb of Midfield to the downtown of Birmingham. The event was canceled after the bombing at the urging of Jefferson County sheriff's deputies. They rode on Farley's motor scooter to the headquarters of the neo-fascist National States' Rights Party where they purchased a Confederate battle flag, which they attached to the scooter before riding toward a Black neighborhood. Upon seeing Virgil and his brother James, who were unaware of the bombing and riding together on a single bicycle, Farley handed Sims a .22 caliber pistol they had bought three days earlier and told Sims to shoot at them to scare them. It ended in Virgil being shot in the cheek and chest.

An all-white jury convicted them of second-degree manslaughter, sentenced to seven months of jail, and had their cases suspended by the judge and changed to two years’ probation.

Ware was buried in an unmarked grave on the side of the road until May 6, 2004, when he was moved to a burial place with a bronze marker thanks to the donations of the community.

As of 2013 he has been inducted into Birmingham’s Gallery of Distinguished Citizens.

Ware's name is among those inscribed on a memorial in Birmingham dedicated in November 1989 to those killed during the civil rights movement.

His family has become greatly involved in the civil rights movement as a result of his death.

Further reading 

 Virgil Ware and Johnny Robinson: Families want history to remember teen boys, too
 The Legacy of Virgil Ware

References 

1949 births
1963 deaths
Civil rights movement
People from Birmingham, Alabama